"Si Te Vas" is a song by Mexican singer Paulina Rubio. The song was released digitally via the iTunes Store by the Spanish division of Universal Music Group on January 22, 2016 as the second single from Rubio's eleventh studio album "Deseo". A second version of the song was also released in the reggaeton genre featuring Alexis & Fido.

Promotion

Universal Music released 'Si Te Vas' in a CD Single format a limited edition of 10 copies autographed by Rubio. This promotion was only valid to residents of Mexico from February 9, 2016 - February 19, 2016, fans would register their credentials and create their best original memes using the #SiTeVas and upload them to Instagram and could participate as many times as they wish, the 10 winners were announced on February 19, 2016.

Track listing 
Digital download (Pop Version)
 "Si Te Vas" - 

Digital download (Reggaeton Version)
 "Si Te Vas (Versión Reggaeton) [feat. Alexis & Fido]" -

Charts

Weekly charts

Year-end charts

References 

2016 singles
Paulina Rubio songs
Spanish-language songs
Universal Music Latino singles